The TCR World Tour is an upcoming international touring car championship for TCR cars. The championship will be promoted by WSC Group Ltd, which was founded by former World Touring Car Championship manager Marcello Lotti.

History

On 14 October 2022, it was reported that the World Touring Car Cup would be folding in that format following the 2022 season due to numerous logistical difficulties caused by COVID-19 pandemic. On the same day, WSC announced the formation of the TCR World Tour. It was launched in order to replace the WTCR. On 12 November 2022, it was announced that Mount Panorama Circuit would feature on the calendar as part of the TCR Australia Touring Car Series. On 30 November 2022, it was confirmed that Algarve International Circuit, Circuit de Spa-Francorchamps and Hungaroring would feature on the calendar as part of the TCR Europe Touring Car Series. On 13 January 2023, it was confirmed that Vallelunga Circuit would feature on the calendar as part of the Italian Superturismo Championship. On 8 February 2023, it was announced that Autódromo Víctor Borrat Fabini and Potrero de los Funes Circuit would feature on the calendar as part of the 2023 TCR South America Touring Car Championship, while Guia Circuit would feature as part of the 2023 China Touring Car Championship.

See also
 World Touring Car Championship
 World Touring Car Cup
 TCR International Series

References

External links
  

TCR Series
Touring car racing series
Recurring sporting events established in 2023